The 2023–24 North Carolina Tar Heels men's basketball team will represent the University of North Carolina at Chapel Hill during the 2023–24 NCAA Division I men's basketball season. The team will be led by coach Hubert Davis, who will enter his third season as UNC's head coach, and will be assisted by Jeff Lebo, Sean May, and Brad Frederick. The Tar Heels will play their home games at the Dean Smith Center in Chapel Hill, as members of the Atlantic Coast Conference.

Previous Season

After starters Caleb Love, R. J. Davis, Armando Bacot, and Leaky Black, who had been key pieces in the 2021–22 team's National Runner-Up finish, decided to return for the 2022–23 season, the Tar Heels earned the No. 1 ranking in the preseason AP Poll. Despite the lofty expectations and desires to win the championship that had narrowly eluded them the season prior, the 2022–23 Tar Heels struggled mightily, finishing the season 20–13 (11–9 in conference play) and missing the NCAA tournament altogether. The 2022–23 team became the first preseason No. 1 to miss the NCAA tournament since the field expanded to 64 teams in 1985. After missing the "big dance," the Tar Heels issued a statement declining a bid for the NIT.

Bacot, despite battling ankle and shoulder injuries that kept him out of several games, proved to be one of the lone bright spots on the season, as neither Love, Davis, nor Black returned to their form from the 2022 tournament run. Bacot set all-time program records for career double-doubles by passing Billy Cunningham's school record of 61, and he also became the all-time leading rebounder in program history by passing Tyler Hansbrough's record as well.

Offseason
After declining the NIT bid, the Tar Heels' 2023 offseason began sooner than many expected. On March 13, 2023, the Transfer Portal officially opened, and the Tar Heels immediately lost players, with first-year forward Tyler Nickel and senior Justin McKoy both entering the portal. Leaky Black and Pete Nance, who had both used their extra year of eligibility provided by the COVID-19 Pandemic, departed as well. 

A few days later, sophomore guard/forward Dontrez Styles also announced his intentions to leave the Tar Heels and enter the transfer portal.

Doubt remains as to whether starters Love, Davis, and Bacot (who has a 5th year available due to COVID), or any of the other players from the 22–23 team with remaining eligibility, will enter the transfer portal, go pro, or return to Chapel Hill for the 2023–24 season.

Departures

Additions

Recruiting Class

Personnel

Coaching Staff

Roster
Currently, doubt remains as to what exactly the 23-24 roster will look like. Armando Bacot, Caleb Love, and R. J. Davis, and the remaining roster members have yet to decide their future plans.

Schedule
The full schedule for 2023–24 will be released at a later date. 

In addition to the 20-game ACC conference schedule, the Tar Heels are scheduled to play in the 2023 Battle 4 Atlantis, the CBS Sports Classic against Kentucky, the Jimmy V Classic in Madison Square Garden, the Jumpman Invitational, and the inaugural ACC/SEC Challenge (following the conclusion of the ACC-Big Ten Challenge in the '22–
'23 season). Source:

References

North Carolina Tar Heels men's basketball seasons
North Carolina Tar Heels men's basketball